Qapi-ye Baba Ali (also Romanized as Qapī-ye Bābā ‘Alī; also known as Kopeh-ye Bābā ‘Alī, Kopi-Bāb ‘Ali, Koppeh Bābā ‘Alī, Koppeh-ye Bābā ‘Alī, Qopī Bāb ‘Alī, Qowbī-ye Bābā ‘Alī, and Qowpī-ye Bābā ‘Alī) is a village in Mokriyan-e Sharqi Rural District, in the Central District of Mahabad County, West Azerbaijan Province, Iran. At the 2006 census, its population was 597, in 118 families.

References 

Populated places in Mahabad County